The Bludworth articulated tug and barge (ATB) ocean tug barge connection system was developed by Richard and Robert Bludworth during the 1960s.  

The first Bludworth articulated tug barge unit was the ocean Liquefied petroleum gas (LPG) barge Ponciana which was coupled with the converted ATB tug Texan in 1970.  Texan sank off Cape Hatteras in 1979.  Ponciana is still a working ocean LPG barge coupled with the 1980-built tug Texan.

See also
 Integrated tug and barge

Tugboats